The Owen Creek Formation is a stratigraphic unit of Middle Ordovician age. It is present on the western edge of the Western Canada Sedimentary Basin in the Canadian Rockies of Alberta and British Columbia. It consists primarily of dolomite and was named for Owen Creek near Mount Wilson in Banff National Park by B.S. Norford in 1969.

Lithology and thickness
The Owen Creek Formation consists primarily of dolomite that typically includes minor amounts of quartz silt and very fine sand. There are minor beds of dolomitic mudstone near the base, and beds of dolomitic quartz sandstone and siltstone in the upper part. It has a maximum thickness of about 199 m (652 ft).

Distribution and relationship to other units
The Owen Creek Formation is present in the southern Canadian Rockies and is equivalent to the black shales Glenogle Formation to the west. It is also present in some areas of the central Rockies in northeastern British Columbia. It overlies the Skoki Formation, and unconformably underlies the Mount Wilson Formation.

References

Western Canadian Sedimentary Basin
Geologic formations of Canada
Geologic formations of Alberta
Stratigraphy of Alberta
Stratigraphy of British Columbia